Nationality words link to articles with information on the nation's poetry or literature (for instance, Irish or France).

Events

 January 1 – Cecil Day-Lewis is announced as the new Poet Laureate of the UK.
 May 19 – The Last Poets, originally comprising Felipe Luciano, Gylan Kain and David Nelson, form at Marcus Garvey Park in East Harlem, New York City, on Malcolm X's birthday.
 November 23 – Roy Fuller is elected professor of poetry at Oxford University (with 385 votes) to succeed Edmund Blunden, who unexpectedly left. Other nominees were Kathleen Raine, Enid Starkie and Yevgeni Yevtushenko.
 The Arvon Foundation is established by young poets John Fairfax and John Moat in the UK to promote creative writing.
 The Belfast Group, a grouping of poets in Belfast, Northern Ireland, which was started in 1963 in poetry and lapsed in 1966 when founder Philip Hobsbaum left for Glasgow, is reconstituted this year by Michael Allen, Arthur Terry, and Seamus Heaney. At various times, the group also includes Michael Longley, James Simmons, Paul Muldoon, Ciaran Carson, Stewart Parker, Bernard MacLaverty and the critic Edna Longley. Meetings are held at Seamus and Marie Heaney's house on Ashley Avenue. The group will last until 1972.
 The first translations and book-length discussion of Enheduanna's work is published. She is a Sumerian priestess and poet of the 23rd century BC and the earliest named author known to history.
 The Honest Ulsterman, a long-running Northern Ireland literary magazine, is established this year by James Simmons. It is then edited for 20 years by Frank Ormsby.

Works published in English
Listed by nation where the work was first published and again by the poet's native land, if different; substantially revised works listed separately:

Canada
 Leonard Cohen, Selected Poems, 1956-1968
 Irving Layton, The Shattered Plinths, 60 new poems.
 Dennis Lee, Civil Elegies. Toronto: Anansi.
 Dorothy Livesay, The Documentaries. Poems from the 1930s and 1940s, and including "Roots", a long poem
 Pat Lowther, This Difficult Flowering
 Jay Macpherson, The Boatman and Other Poems. Toronto: Oxford UP.
 E. J. Pratt, Selected Poems of E. J. Pratt, Peter Buitenhuis ed., Toronto: Macmillan.
 Al Purdy, Wild Grape Wine
 Joe Rosenblatt, Winter of the Luna Moth. Toronto: Anansi.
 W.W.E. Ross, Shapes & sounds: poems of W. W. E. Ross (with a portrait by Dennis Burton, a memoir by Barry Callaghan, and an editorial note by Raymond Souster and John Robert Colombo). (Toronto: Longman's)
Raymond Souster, Lost and Found: Uncollected Poems. Toronto: Clarke, Irwin.

Anthologies in Canada
 Mary Alice Downie and Barbara Robertson, editors, The Wind Has Wings, anthology of 77 Canadian poems for children
 Dennis Lee, editor, T.O. Now, anthology of 13 "apprentice poets living in Toronto"

India in English
R. ParthasarathyPoetry from Leeds ( Poetry in English ). Leeds: Oxford University Press, UK 1968.
 G. S. Sharat Chandra, Bharat Natyam Dancer and Other Poems ( Poetry in English ), Calcutta: Writers Workshop, India .
 Deb Kumar Das, The Eye of Autumn: An Experiment in Poetry ( Poetry in English ), Calcutta: Writers Workshop, India'
 Ira De, The Hunt and Other Poems, revised edition, ( Poetry in English ), Calcutta: Writers Workshop, India (see also first edition 1961)
 Gauri Deshpande, Between Births ( Poetry in English ), Calcutta: Writers Workshop, India
 Indira Devi Dhanrajgir, Partings in Mimosa, Hyderabad
 Guari Deshpande, Between Births ( Poetry in English ), Calcutta: Writers Workshop, India
 Paul Jacob, Sonnets ( Poetry in English ), Calcutta: Writers Workshop, India
 S. R. Mokashi-Punekar, P. Lal: An Appreciation( Poetry in English ), Calcutta: Writers Workshop, India
 Dom Moraes, My Son's Father, autobiography
Srinavas Rayaprol, Bones & Distances( Poetry in English ), Calcutta: Writers Workshop, India
 Pradip Sen, And Then the Sun, revised edition (first edition, 1960, ( Poetry in English ), Calcutta: Writers Workshop, India
 Vinay K. Varma, Poppies and Ashes
 Swami Vivekananda, Search of God and Other Poems, Calcutta: Advaita Ashram
 Suniti Namjoshi and Sarojini Namjoshi, translators, Poems of Govindagraj, translated from Marathi, Calcutta: Writers Workshop , India

United Kingdom
 W. H. Auden:
 Collected Longer Poems
 Secondary Worlds, lecture given in October
 Selected Poems
 Dannie Abse, A Small Desperation
 Kingsley Amis, A Look Round the Estate
 Edward Brathwaite, Masks
 Basil Bunting, Collected Poems
 Charles Causley, Underneath the Water
 Stewart Conn, Stoats in Sunlight
 Tony Connor, Kon in Springtime
 Maureen Duffy, Lyrics for the Dog Hour
 D. J. Enright, Unlawful Assembly
 Gavin Ewart, The Deceptive Grin of the Gravel Porters
 James Fenton, Our Western Furniture
 Roy Fuller, New Poems
 William R. P. George - Cerddi'r Neraig
 Zulfikar Ghose, Jets from Orange
 Robert Graves, Poems 1965–1968
 Harry Guest, Arrangements
 John Heath-Stubbs, Satires and Epigrams
 Adrian Henri, Tonight at Noon
 John Hewitt, Northern Irish poet published in the United Kingdom, The Day of the Corncrake
 Norman Jackson, Beyond the Habit of Sense
 A. Norman Jeffares, A New Commentary On The Poems Of W.B. Yeats, criticism
 James Kirkup, Paper Windows
 George MacBeth, The Night of Stones
 Norman MacCaig, Rings on a Tree
 Derek Mahon, Night-Crossing, Oxford University Press
 Adrian Mitchell, Out Loud
 Edwin Morgan, The Second Life, his first collection and the first in Britain to be typeset by computer
 Richard Murphy, The Battle of Aughrim
 Ruth Pitter, Poems 1926–1966
 J. H. Prynne, Kitchen Poems
 Edith Anne Robertson, Translations Into the Scots Tongue of Poems By Gerard Manley Hopkins
 Muriel Spark, Collected Poems Volume 1
 R. S. Thomas, Not That He Brought Flowers
 J. R. R. Tolkien, The Road Goes Ever On, first published in the United States 1967
 Vernon Watkins, Fidelities

Anthologies in the United Kingdom
 John Bishop, Music and Sweet Poetry, poems about music
 Rodney Hall and Thomas Shapcott, editors, New Impulses in Australian Poetry
 Howard Sergeant, Poetry from Africa (published in the United Kingdom), including work from Gabriel Okara (Nigeria), Gaston Bart-Williams (Sierra Leone), Kwesi Brew (Ghana) and David Rubadiri (Malawi)
 Jean Sergeant and Howard Sergeant, Poems from Hospital
 Joan Murray Simpson, Without Adam: The Femina Anthology of Poetry, poems by women

United States
 James Agee, The Collected Poems of James Agee, including 60 poems previously unpublished in books (posthumous)
 A. R. Ammons, Selected Poems
 Paul Blackburn, In. On. Or About The Premises
 Gwendolyn Brooks, In the Mecca
 Raymond Carver, Near Klamath
 Stanley Cooperman, The Day of the Parrot and Other Poems
 Robert Creeley, Pieces
 Ed Dorn and Gordon Brotherston, translators, Our Word: Guerilla Poems From Latin America, Grossman
 Ed Dorn, Gunslinger, Black Sparrow Press
 Robert Duncan, Bending the Bow
 Allen Ginsberg, T.V. Baby Poems
 John Hollander, Types of Shape
 Etheridge Knight, Poems from Prison
 Rod McKuen, Lonesome Cities
 Archibald MacLeish, The Wild Wicked Old Man and Other Poems
 Ogden Nash, There's Always Another Windmill
 Howard Nemerov, The Winter Lightning: Selected Poems
 Lorine Niedecker, North Central (Fulcrum Press: London)
 Ned O'Gorman, The Harversters' Vase
 George Oppen, Of Being Numerous
 Kenneth Rexroth, Collected Longer Poems
 Charles Reznikoff, second Testimony collection
 Aram Saroyan, Aram Saroyan, Random House
 Karl Shapiro, Selected Poems (more than 200, including 25 previously unpublished)
 L. E. Sissman, Dying: An Introduction
 Mark Strand, Reasons for Moving, Canadian native published in the United States
 Alice Walker, Once

Anthologies in the United States
 Paul Carroll, editor, The Young American Poets, anthology of 54 poets
 LeRoi Jones and Larry Neal, editors, Black Fire, an anthology of African-American poetry
 Phyllis McGinley, editor, Wonders and Surprises, anthology for juveniles, including poems by Elinor Wylie, E. B. White, Langston Hughes and T. S. Eliot

Other in English
 Edward Brathwaite, Masks, second part of his The Arrivants trilogy, which also includes Rights of Passage (1967) and Islands (1969), Caribbean
 Kendrick Smithyman, Flying to Palmerston, Christchurch: Auckland University & Oxford University Press, New Zealand
 R. Hall and T. Shapcott, editors, New Impulses in Australian Poetry, anthology, Australia
 Richard Murphy, The Battle of Aughrim, Ireland

Works published in other languages
Listed by language and often by nation where the work was first published and again by the poet's native land, if different; substantially revised works listed separately:

Denmark
 Per Højholt, Turbo
 Hans Jørgen Nielsen, Fra luften i munden
 Thorkild Bjørnvig, Ravnen

French language

Canada, in French
 Jean-Guy Pilon, Comme eau retenue : poèmes 1954-1963, Montréal: l'Hexagone
 Yves Préfontaine, Pays sans parole

France
 P. Albert-Birot, Poètes d'aujourd'hui (posthumous), edited by J. Follain
 Marc Alyn, La Nuit majeure
 J. Berthet:
 Poèsiepures
 Quelconqueries
 J. Bancal, L'Épreuve du feu
 André du Bouchet, OU LE SOLEIL
 A. Bosquet, Quatre Testaments et autres poèmes
 Andrée Chedid, Contre–Chant
 Rene Char, Dans la pluie giboyeuse
 C. Fourcade, De Lumière et de nuit
 L. Foucher, Argyne et les Gypaètes, third part of a trilogy
 André Frénaud, La Sainte Face
 Armel Lubin, Feux contre feux
 F. Millepierres, Cheval noir et cheval blanc
 Raymond Queneau, Battre la campagne
 G. Puel, La Lumière du jour
 Denis Roche, Éros énergumène
 Jean Tardieu, Le Fleuve caché

German language
 Paul Celan, Threadsuns (Fadensonnen)

Hebrew
 A. Shlonsky, Mishiai ha-Perozdor ha-Aroch ("From the Poems of the Long Corridor")
 A. Gilboa, Lichtov Siftai Yeshainim ("To Write from the Lips of the Sleepers"), Israel
 Haim Gouri, Tenua le-Maga ("A Move to Touch")
 A. Halfi, Mivhar Shirimx ("Selected Poems")
 A. Kovner, Ahot Ketana ("Little Sister")
 B. Galai, Massa Zafonah ("Northward Journey")
 D. Pagis, Shirai Levi Ibn Altabban (prose), a study of the Medieval Hebrew poet's work

India
Listed in alphabetical order by first name:
 Buddhidhari Singha, Sarasayya, a long poem published as a book; Maithili-language
 Nilmani Phookan, Aru Ki Naisabda, Guwahati, Assam: Dutta Barua; India, Assamese-language
 Varavara Rao (better known as "VV"), Chali Negallu or Chalinegallu ("Camp Fires"), Hanamkonda: Svecha Sahiti; India, Telugu-language

Italy
 Giorgio Vigolo, La luce ricorda, collection of poems from 1923 and after
 Sergio Solmi, Dal balcone
 Giovanni Testori, L'amore
 Giuseppe Guglielmi, 
 Andrea Zalzotto, La beltà
 Franco Fortini, Una volta per sempre
 Angela Giannitrapani, Professione di poesia

Norway
 Arnulf Øverland, De hundrede fioliner: Dikt i utvalg (posthumous)
 Tor Obrestad, Vårt daglige brød
 Arnljot Eggen, Roller og røynd
 Hallvard Lie, Norsk verslære, a scholarly study on Norwegian poetry

Portuguese language

Brazil
 João Cabral de Melo Neto, Complete Works
 Augusto de Campos, Haroldo de Campos and Boris Schnaiderman, editors:
 An anthology of modern Russian poetry from Symbolism to the present in Portuguese
 Traduzir e Trovar, an anthology of translated poetry, including poetry from France, Italy and England.

Criticism and theory
 Augusto de Campos, O balanço da Bossa, a study of the relationship of Brazilian popular music to "vanguardist" poetry
 Luiz Costa Lima, Lira e Antilira, essays on modern Brazilian poetry
 Décio Pignatari, Informação, Linguagem, Communicação, critical study of vanguardist art and mass culture

Russia
 Aleksandr Tvardovsky, Selected Lyrics 1959-67
 Alexander Mezhirov, Лебяжий переулок ("Swan's Lane"), Russia, Soviet Union
 Robert Rozhdestvensky, Poem from Various Points of View
 Yaroslav Smelyakov, December, poems published serially in the periodical Friendship Between the Peoples last year and this year

Spanish language
 Rafael Méndez Dorich, Cantos Rodados (Lima), Peru
 Nicanor Parra, Canciones rusas, Chile
 Emma Godoy, a book interpreting of "Muerte sin fin" by José Gorostiza, Mexico

Sweden
 Lars Forssell, a book of poetry
 Johannes Edfelt, a book of poetry
 Petter Bergman, a book of poetry
 Lars Gustalfsson, a book of poetry

Yiddish

United States
 Yaykev Glatshteyn, a book of poems
 Aron Tseytlin, Poems of the Holocaust and Poems of Faith
 Efroyim Oyerbakh, a book of poems
 I. J. Shvarts, a book of poems
 Itsik Manger, a book of poems
 Eliezer Grinberg, a book of poems
 Rokhl Korn, a book of poems
 A. Glants-Leyeles, I Do Remember (posthumous)

Israel
 Malke Loker, a book of poems
 Leyb Olitski, a book of poems
 Avrom Lev, a book of poems
 I. Manik, a book of poems
 Binem Heler, a book of poems
 Rivke Basman, a book of poems
 Abraham Sutzkever, Square Letters and Miracles

Soviet Union
 Itsik Fefer, a book of poems
 Zyame Telesin, a book of poems
 Mendl Lifshits, a book of poems

Poland
 Eliyohu Reyzman, a book of poems
 P. Tsibulski, a book of poems (posthumous)

Other languages
 Nizar Qabbani, Diary of an Indifferent Woman, Syrian poet writing in Arabic

Awards and honors

Canada
 See 1968 Governor General's Awards for a complete list of winners and finalists for those awards.
 Canadian Centennial Commission poetry competition: First prize: Margaret Atwood, The Animals in That Country

United Kingdom
 Cholmondeley Award: Harold Massingham, Edwin Morgan
 Eric Gregory Award: James Aitchison, Douglas Dunn, Brian Jones
 Queen's Gold Medal for Poetry: Robert Graves

United States
 American Academy of Arts and Letters Gold Medal in Poetry, W. H. Auden
 Consultant in Poetry to the Library of Congress (later the post would be called "Poet Laureate Consultant in Poetry to the Library of Congress"): William Jay Smith appointed this year.
 National Book Award for Poetry: Robert Bly, The Light Around the Body
 Pulitzer Prize for Poetry: Anthony Hecht, The Hard Hours
 Fellowship of the Academy of American Poets: Stanley Kunitz

Births
 July 2 – A. E. Stallings, American poet
Dates not known:
 Mark Bibbins, American poet
 Nan Cohen, American poet
 Jun Er, Chinese poet
 Patrick McGuinness, English poet and academic
 Michael Teig, American poet

Deaths
Birth years link to the corresponding "[year] in poetry" article:
 January 1 – Donagh MacDonagh, 55, Irish poet, playwright and judge
 January 13 – William Williams (Crwys), 93, Welsh poet
 January 14 – Dorothea Mackellar, 82, Australian poet and writer
 January 18 – Gamel Woolsey, 72, American poet and writer, in Spain
 January 20 – David Derek Stacton, 42, American novelist, historian and poet
 January 25 – Yvor Winters, 67, American literary critic and poet
 February 16 – Jaime Sabartés, 55, Spanish poet and longtime secretary to Pablo Picasso
 March 16 – Gunnar Ekelöf, 60, Swedish poet
 March 25 – Arnulf Øverland, 78, Norwegian poet
 April 26 – Donald Davidson, 74, American poet, essayist, social and literary critic and author, organizer of the Nashville circle of poets called the Fugitives and an overlapping group, the Southern Agrarians
 April 28 – Winfield Townley Scott, 58, American poet
 May – Erik Lindegren 58, Swedish poet
 May 9 – George Dillon, 62, American poet and editor
 June 1 –  Witter Bynner, 86, American poet, writer and scholar
 June 8 – Mira Mendelson, 53 (born 1915), Russian poet, writer, translator and librettist, heart attack
 June 12 – Sir Herbert Read, 74, English poet and critic of literature and art
 June 14 – Salvatore Quasimodo, 66, Italian poet
 June 17 – Aleksei Kruchenykh, 82, Russian Futurist poet
 November 17 – Mervyn Peake, 57, British modernist writer, artist, poet and illustrator
 December 10 – Thomas Merton, 53 (born 1915), American poet, author and Roman Catholic monk, in a freak accident in a visit to Bangkok, Thailand
 December 24 – D. Gwenallt Jones, 69, Welsh poet
 date not known – Eckart Peterich (born 1900), German poet

See also

 Poetry
 List of poetry awards
 List of years in poetry

References
 Lal, P., Modern Indian Poetry in English: An Anthology & a Credo, p .........., Calcutta: Writers Workshop, second edition, 1971 (however, on page 597 an "editor's note" states contents "on the following pages are a supplement to the first edition" and is dated "1972"); hereafter: "P. Lal (1971)"

Poetry

20th-century poetry